Sukhraj Aujla (2 January 1968 – 23 March 2013) was a Punjabi folk singer. He became popular after singing songs like Nimi nimi tarian di lo and Rangli Madhani. He died on 23 March 2013 in a road crash.

References 

1968 births
2013 deaths
Punjabi artists
Indian male folk singers
Road incident deaths in India
20th-century Indian male singers
20th-century Indian singers